Cristina Amaya (born October 28, 1988) is a Colombian racquetball player. Amaya finished the 2017-18 Ladies Professional Racquetball Tour (LPRT) season as the 8th ranked player, which was her eighth consecutive season in the top 10 (first was the 2010-11 season). She was the third South American player to be in the women's pro top 10 after Angela Grisar and Veronica Sotomayor.

Professional career
Amaya has been playing the women's pro tour since 2009. She has reached the finals twice. First, Amaya was in the final of the 2013 Abierto Mexicano de Racquetas tournament, where she lost to Paola Longoria, and most recently, she was a finalist in the 2017 New Jersey Open, when she again lost to Longoria. Amaya's career high ranking was 3rd in December 2013. She was named Most Improved LPRT player for 2013.

Amaya and Adriana Riveros were finalists in Ladies Professional Racquetball Tour Doubles at the 2017 US Open Racquetball Championships, losing to Paola Longoria and Gabriela Martinez, 15-5, 15-8.

International career

In 2017, Amaya won Women's Singles at the 2017 Bolivarian Games in Santa Marta, Colombia, and her performance helped Colombia get bronze in the team event. Four years earlier, Amaya was a bronze medalist in Women's Singles, as well as silver medalist in Women's Doubles - with Carolina Gomez - and Women's Team at the 2013 Bolivarian Games in Trujillo, Peru.

Amaya plays for Colombia and was a silver medalist at the 2013 World Games, losing in a tie-breaker to Paola Longoria in the final.

She has earned three bronze medals at the Pan American Championships. Her first was in 2014 Pan Am Championships in Santa Cruz, Bolivia, where she lost in the semi-finals to Susana Acosta, 15-10, 14-15, 11-7. In 2015, Amaya was a semi-finalist in both Women's Singles, losing to Veronica Sotomayor of Ecuador, 15-3, 15-8, and Woman's Doubles with Vivian Gomez, losing to Mexicans Longoria and Samantha Salas, 15-6, 15-3.

References

See also
 List of racquetball players
 LPRT page for Cristina Amaya
 Twitter page for Cristina Amaya

Living people
1988 births
Colombian racquetball players
Racquetball players at the 2015 Pan American Games
Pan American Games competitors for Colombia
World Games silver medalists
Competitors at the 2013 World Games
South American Games bronze medalists for Colombia
South American Games medalists in racquetball
Competitors at the 2018 South American Games
Central American and Caribbean Games silver medalists for Colombia
Central American and Caribbean Games bronze medalists for Colombia
Competitors at the 2014 Central American and Caribbean Games
Competitors at the 2018 Central American and Caribbean Games
Racquetball players at the 2011 Pan American Games
Racquetball players at the 2019 Pan American Games
Central American and Caribbean Games medalists in racquetball
20th-century Colombian women
21st-century Colombian women
Competitors at the 2022 World Games